The 2015 FIVB Beach Volleyball World Tour was an international beach volleyball circuit organized by the Fédération Internationale de Volleyball (FIVB).

From this season, the FIVB World Tour calendar comprises by 5 FIVB World Tour Grand Slams, 6 Open tournaments (Prague only for women), the newly FIVB Major Series with three events and the FIVB Beach Volleyball World Championships.

An inaugural edition of the FIVB World Tour Finals was held in the United States and concluded the season.

Schedule
Key

Men

Women

Medal table by country

References

External links
2015 FIVB Beach Volleyball World Tour at FIVB.org

 

World Tour
2015
Beach